is a railway station in Izumi, Kagoshima, Japan.
The station opened on October 15, 1923.

Lines 
Kyushu Railway Company
Kyushu Shinkansen
Hisatsu Orange Railway
Hisatsu Orange Railway Line

Platforms

Hisatsu Orange Railway

JR Kyushu

Adjacent stations

External links

 JR Kyushu-Izumi Station 

Railway stations in Kagoshima Prefecture
Railway stations in Japan opened in 1923
Stations of Hisatsu Orange Railway